SM UC-71 was a German Type UC II minelaying submarine or U-boat in the German Imperial Navy during World War I. The U-boat was ordered on 12 January 1916 and was launched on 12 August 1916. She was commissioned into the German Imperial Navy on 28 November 1916 as SM UC-71. In 19 patrols UC-71 was credited with sinking 63 ships, either by torpedo or by mines laid. UC-71 sank on 20 February 1919 in the North Sea while on her way to be surrendered.

Design
A German Type UC II submarine, UC-71 had a displacement of  when at the surface and  while submerged. The submarine was powered by two six-cylinder four-stroke diesel engines each producing  (a total of ), two electric motors producing , and two propeller shafts.

UC-71 was fitted with six  mine tubes, eighteen UC 200 mines, three  torpedo tubes (one on the stern and two on the bow), seven torpedoes, and one  Uk L/30 deck gun. Her complement was twenty-six crew members.

Summary of raiding history

References

Notes

Citations

Bibliography

 
 

Ships built in Hamburg
German Type UC II submarines
U-boats commissioned in 1916
U-boats sunk in 1919
Maritime incidents in 1919
World War I minelayers of Germany
World War I shipwrecks in the North Sea
World War I submarines of Germany
1916 ships